This is a list of people elected Fellow of the Royal Society in 1939.

Fellows 

Gilbert Smithson Adair
Christopher Howard Andrewes
Max Born
Albert James Bradley
Sir David Brunt
Francis Albert Eley Crew
Frederick Wallace Edwards
Sir Bennett Melvill Jones
George William Clarkson Kaye
Edward George Tandy Liddell
Ernest John Maskell
Sir James Irvine Orme Masson
Charles Edward Kenneth Mees
Maxwell Herman Alexander Newman
Herbert Harold Read
Sir Reginald George Stapledon
Hubert Maitland Turnbull
Eustace Ebenezer Turner
Sir Vincent Brian Wigglesworth
Evan James Williams

Foreign members

Walter Bradford Cannon
Herbert Max Finlay Freundlich
George Charles de Hevesy

Statue 12 

William Richard Morris, 1st Viscount Nuffield
John Davison Rockefeller

1939
1939 in science
1939 in the United Kingdom